The 2008 Indiana Fever season was their 9th season in the Women's National Basketball Association (WNBA). They finished 4th in the Eastern Conference with 17 wins and 17 losses on the season. The season marked the fourth consecutive season that the Fever earned a playoff berth. They were eliminated in the Eastern Conference Semi-Finals 2–1 by the Detroit Shock.

Offseason
On October 26, 2007 the Fever announced that they declined the option for head coach, Brian Winters, ending his four-year tenure as head coach. On December 12, 2007 assistant coach Lin Dunn was named as the replacement for Winters.

In one of the biggest trades in WNBA history the Fever traded Tamika Whitmore and their first-round pick in the 2008 WNBA Draft to the Connecticut Sun for Indianapolis native, Katie Douglas on February 19, 2008.

The following player was selected in the Expansion Draft by the Atlanta Dream :
Ann Strother

2008 WNBA Draft

Indiana's selections from the 2008 WNBA Draft in Tampa Bay.

Transactions
The Fever were involved in the following transactions during the 2008 season.

Trades

Free Agents

Additions

Subtractions

Re-signings

Roster

Depth

Season standings

Schedule

Preseason

|- align="center" bgcolor="ffbbbb"
| 1 || May 3 || @ Chicago || L 81-71 || Terry (12) || Bales (9) || Jinks (5) || Al McGuire Center  1,134 || 0-1
|- align="center" bgcolor="ffbbbb"
| 2 || May 7 || Minnesota || L 78-64 || White (16) || Bales (4) || White (4) || Conseco Fieldhouse  5,196 || 0-2
|- align="center" bgcolor="ffbbbb"
| 3 || May 10 || @ Seattle || L 75-64 || White (21) || Bales (7) || Selwyn, White (3) || KeyArena  5,475 || 0-3
|-

Regular season

|- align="center" bgcolor="bbffbb"
| 1 || May 17 || Washington || W 64-53 || Douglas (24) || Douglas, White (7) || White (4) || Conseco Fieldhouse  10,533 || 1-0
|- align="center" bgcolor="ffbbbb"
| 2 || May 21 || @ Detroit || L 76-71 || Douglas (26) || Hoffman (10) || White (6) || The Palace of Auburn Hills  6,842 || 1-1
|- align="center" bgcolor="bbffbb"
| 3 || May 27 || @ Connecticut || W 73-46 || Douglas (23) || Hoffman (13) || Douglas, Hoffman (5) || Mohegan Sun Arena  5,245 || 2-1
|- align="center" bgcolor="bbffbb"
| 4 || May 29 || Los Angeles || W 82-78 (2OT) || Douglas (25) || Hoffman (11) || Bevilaqua, White (5) || Conseco Fieldhouse  9,235 || 3-1
|- align="center" bgcolor="ffbbbb"
| 5 || May 31 || Detroit || L 74-65 || White (14) || Hoffman (8) || Douglas (5) || Conseco Fieldhouse  9,219 || 3-2
|-

|- align="center" bgcolor="bbffbb"
| 6 || June 7 || Houston || W 84-75 || Douglas (20) || Hoffman (10) || Douglas, Hoffman (4) || Conseco Fieldhouse  8,214 || 4-2
|- align="center" bgcolor="ffbbbb"
| 7 || June 11 || @ San Antonio || L 64-53 || Douglas, White (13) || Hoffman (9) || Douglas (4) || AT&T Center  6,262 || 4-3
|- align="center" bgcolor="bbffbb"
| 8 || June 13 || @ Atlanta || W 76-67 || White (21) || Sutton-Brown (12) || Douglas (7) || Philips Arena  8,167 || 5-3
|- align="center" bgcolor="ffbbbb"
| 9 || June 15 || San Antonio || L 70-60 || Douglas (17) || Hoffman (10) || Hoffman (4) || Conseco Fieldhouse  7,412 || 5-4
|- align="center" bgcolor="bbffbb"
| 10 || June 18 || New York || W 83-69 || Douglas (16) || Douglas (8) || Douglas (5) || Conseco Fieldhouse  6,333 || 6-4
|- align="center" bgcolor="ffbbbb"
| 11 || June 20 || @ Seattle || L 78-70 || Sutton-Brown (14) || Hoffman (10) || Catchings, White (4) || KeyArena  7,393 || 6-5
|- align="center" bgcolor="ffbbbb"
| 12 || June 22 || @ Los Angeles || L 77-63 || Catchings (17) || Hoffman (10) || Catchings (3) || Staples Center  9,463 || 6-6
|- align="center" bgcolor="bbffbb"
| 13 || June 24 || Sacramento || W 78-73 || Hoffman (23) || Hoffman (13) || Bevilaqua, Feaster, Ebony Hoffman (3) || Conseco Fieldhouse  6,020 || 7-6
|- align="center" bgcolor="ffbbbb"
| 14 || June 26 || @ New York || L 102-96 (3OT) || Hoffman (26) || Sutton-Brown (15) || Bevilaqua (5) || Madison Square Garden  7,899 || 7-7
|- align="center" bgcolor="ffbbbb"
| 15 || June 28 || @ Houston || L 75-61 || Sutton-Brown (13) || Sutton-Brown (6) || Douglas (4) || Reliant Arena  7,008 || 7-8
|-

|- align="center" bgcolor="bbffbb"
| 16 || July 2 || Chicago || W 74-67 || Catchings (18) || Sutton-Brown (12) || Catchings, Douglas (3) || Conseco Fieldhouse  6,196 || 8-8
|- align="center" bgcolor="bbffbb"
| 17 || July 5 || Connecticut || W 81-74 || Douglas, Sutton-Brown (18) || Sutton-Brown (9) || Douglas (5) || Conseco Fieldhouse  6,329 || 9-8
|- align="center" bgcolor="ffbbbb"
| 18 || July 8 || @ Washington || L 50-48 || Hoffman (16) || Hoffman (9) || Bevilaqua (4) || Verizon Center  7,587 || 9-9
|- align="center" bgcolor="bbffbb"
| 19 || July 12 || Chicago || W 66-57 || Douglas (25) || Catchings (8) || Catchings (4) || Conseco Fieldhouse  7,134 || 10-9
|- align="center" bgcolor="ffbbbb"
| 20 || July 16 || Atlanta || L 81-77 || Catchings (18) || Catchings (12) || Catchings (5) || Conseco Fieldhouse  9,303 || 10-10
|- align="center" bgcolor="ffbbbb"
| 21 || July 18 || Seattle || L 65-59 || Sutton-Brown (12) || Sutton-Brown (7) || Bevilaqua, Bond (3) || Conseco Fieldhouse  7,450 || 10-11
|- align="center" bgcolor="bbffbb"
| 22 || July 19 || @ New York  Liberty Outdoor Classic || W 71-55 || Douglas (20) || Catchings, Sutton-Brown (9) || Catchings, Douglas (4) || Arthur Ashe Stadium  19,393 || 11-11
|- align="center" bgcolor="ffbbbb"
| 23 || July 22 || @ Chicago || L 68-60 || Douglas, Sutton-Brown (14) || Sutton-Brown (10) || Catchings (4) || UIC Pavilion  3,035 || 11-12
|- align="center" bgcolor="ffbbbb"
| 24 || July 24 || Minnesota || L 84-80 || Catchings, Hoffman (17) || Sutton-Brown (9) || Catchings (9) || Conseco Fieldhouse  6,010 || 11-13
|- align="center" bgcolor="ffbbbb"
| 25 || July 26 || @ Sacramento || L 70-62 || Douglas (23) || Hoffman (8) || Catchings, White (4) || Arco Arena  7,082 || 11-14
|- align="center" bgcolor="bbffbb"
| 26 || July 27 || @ Phoenix || W 84-80 || Catchings (25) || Hoffman (7) || Catchings (6) || US Airways Center  7,924 || 12-14
|-

|-
| colspan="9" align="center" valign="middle" | Summer Olympic break
|- align="center" bgcolor="ffbbbb"
| 27 || August 28 || Connecticut || L 84-58 || Bevilaqua, Sutton-Brown (9) || Hoffman (5) || White (3) || Conseco Fieldhouse  6,435 || 12-15
|- align="center" bgcolor="bbffbb"
| 28 || August 30 || Atlanta || W 87-72 || Catchings (23) || Hoffman (14) || Douglas (6) || Conseco Fieldhouse  9,280 || 13-15
|-

|- align="center" bgcolor="bbffbb"
| 29 || September 2 || @ Washington || W 79-68 || Catchings (26) || Catchings (9) || Douglas (4) || Verizon Center  7,244 || 14-15
|- align="center" bgcolor="ffbbbb"
| 30 || September 5 || @ Detroit || L 68-90 || Catchings (20) || Catchings (10) || Bevilaqua (4) || The Palace of Auburn Hills  9,287 || 14-16
|- align="center" bgcolor="bbffbb"
| 31 || September 8 || @ Atlanta || W 81-77 || White (24) || Catchings (10) || Catchings (6) || Philips Arena  7,706 || 15-16
|- align="center" bgcolor="ffbbbb"
| 32 || September 9 || @ Minnesota || L 86-76 || White (21) || Sutton-Brown (11) || Catchings (7) || Target Center  6,706 || 15-17
|- align="center" bgcolor="bbffbb"
| 33 || September 11 || New York || W 74-59 || Sutton-Brown (16) || Catchings (8) || Douglas (5) || Conseco Fieldhouse  7,062 || 16-17
|- align="center" bgcolor="bbffbb"
| 34 || September 14 || Phoenix || W 103-89 || Sutton-Brown (26) || Catchings (9) || Douglas (6) || Conseco Fieldhouse  8,776 || 17-17
|-

Playoffs

|- align="center" bgcolor="ffbbbb"
| 1 || September 19 || Detroit || L 81-72 || Catchings, Hoffman (19) || Sutton-Brown (6) || Catchings (7) || Conseco Fieldhouse  7,613 || Shock lead 1-0
|- align="center" bgcolor="bbffbb"
| 2 || September 21 || @ Detroit || W 89-82 (OT) || Catchings (27) || Hoffman (12) || Bevilaqua (5) || The Palace of Auburn Hills  8,219 || Tied 1-1
|- align="center" bgcolor="ffbbbb"
| 3 || September 23 || @ Detroit || L 80-61 || Sutton-Brown (20) || Hoffman (10) || Catchings (8) || The Palace of Auburn Hills  8,296 || Shock win 2-1
|-

Awards, records and milestones

Awards
Tully Bevilaqua was named to the WNBA All-Defensive First Team.
Katie Douglas was named the Eastern Conference Player of the Week for games played from May 26 through June 1.
Tamika Catchings was awarded the Dawn Staley Community Leadership Award for her work in the Indianapolis community with her Catch the Stars Foundation.
Tamika Catchings was named to the WNBA All-Defensive First Team.
Tammy Sutton-Brown was named the Eastern Conference Player of the Week for games played from September 8 through September 14.
Ebony Hoffman was awarded the WNBA's Most Improved Player Award.

Records
On September 14, 2008 the Indiana Fever set a franchise record for points in a game with 103 against the Phoenix Mercury.

Milestones
Katie Douglas recorded her 3,000th career point July 27, 2008 against the Phoenix Mercury.

Statistics

Season

Player stats

* Statistics include games only played with Fever

Team stats

Playoffs
The Fever clinched a playoff berth on September 9.

Player stats

Team stats

Statistics last updated September 24, 2008.

References

External links
Official Indiana Fever website
Official WNBA website

Indiana
Indiana Fever
Indiana Fever seasons